Carlos Javier "Colo" Mac Allister (born 5 March 1968) is an Argentine politician and former footballer. A left-back, he played for Argentinos Juniors, Boca Juniors, and Racing Club during his career. He also won three international caps for the Argentina national team in 1993. After his football career, Mac Allister was elected as a National Deputy for the Republican Proposal party in 2013, representing his native province of La Pampa. From 2015 to 2018, he served as Secretary of Sports in the government of President Mauricio Macri.

Club career
Mac Allister debuted for Argentinos Juniors in 1986. He transferred to Boca Juniors in 1992, where he scored the winning goal in the gold cup final. In 1996, he left Boca for Racing Club where he played until 1998, playing one final season with Ferro Carril Oeste before retiring at the age of 30.

International career
In 1993, Mac Allister played for the Argentina national team in the qualifiers for the 1994 FIFA World Cup alongside Diego Maradona, Fernando Redondo, Sergio Goycochea, Oscar Ruggeri and Diego Simeone. He was brought into the team in late 1993 following a loss to Colombia on 5 September 1993 in Buenos Aires, and played in the following international games for Argentina:

 31 October 1993: 1–1 draw vs Australia, played in Sydney in the 1994 World Cup inter-continental qualification playoff;
 17 November 1993: 1–0 victory vs Australia, played in Buenos Aires in the 1994 World Cup inter-continental qualification playoff;
 15 December 1993: 2–1 victory vs Germany, played in Miami in a friendly.

However, Mac Allister was not selected for the 1994 FIFA World Cup finals.

Post-playing career
In 1998 the Mac Allister brothers, Carlos and Patricio, established their own sports club for youngsters, the MacAllister Sports Club. They acquired a four-hectare piece of land situated 5 km outside Santa Rosa, in La Pampa province, where they built their own club to train and promote young football players for their subsequent careers in professional football.

He was elected to the National Chamber of Deputies as part of the Republican Proposal party in 2013, representing his native province of La Pampa. From 2015 to 2018, he served as Secretary of Sports in the government of President Mauricio Macri.

Personal life
Mac Allister is of Irish and Italian descent. Mac Allister has ancestors from the Irish town of Donabate. He talked in 2004 about having no deep relations to his roots, but "would love to know Ireland", places he "would someday go". His brother is Patricio Mac Allister. He has three sons who are professional footballers: Alexis, Francis and Kevin.

Honours

References

External links
FIFA Player Statistics

Argentine Primera statistics at Fútbol XXI 

1968 births
Living people
People from Santa Rosa, La Pampa
Argentine people of Scottish descent
Argentine people of Irish descent
Argentine footballers
Association football fullbacks
Argentina international footballers
Argentinos Juniors footballers
Argentine Primera División players
Argentine sportsperson-politicians
Boca Juniors footballers
Racing Club de Avellaneda footballers
Ferro Carril Oeste footballers
Carlos
Members of the Argentine Chamber of Deputies elected in La Pampa
Pan American Games bronze medalists for Argentina
Medalists at the 1987 Pan American Games
Footballers at the 1987 Pan American Games
Pan American Games medalists in football